Cleiothyridina is an extinct genus of brachiopods.

Species 
 †Cleiothyridina accola (Reed 1944)
 †Cleiothyridina acutomarginalis (Waagen 1883)
 †Cleiothyridina ailakensis Reed 1925
 †Cleiothyridina anabathra Waterhouse 1968
 †Cleiothyridina attenuata Cooper 1957
 †Cleiothyridina bajkurica (Chernyak 1963)
 †Cleiothyridina bajtuganensis (Netschajew 1911)
 †Cleiothyridina baracoodensis (Etheridge 1903)
 †Cleiothyridina barbata Chronic 1949
 †Cleiothyridina capillata (Waagen 1883)
 †Cleiothyridina circularis (Ustritsky 1960)
 †Cleiothyridina ciriacksi Cooper and Grant 1976
 †Cleiothyridina corculum Lee & Su 1980
 †Cleiothyridina dalmiriensis (Reed 1944)
 †Cleiothyridina davidsoni (Rigaux 1873)
 †Cleiothyridina deroissyi (Leveille 1835)
 †Cleiothyridina dilimensis Grunt 1977
 †Cleiothyridina echidniformis Waterhouse 1983
 †Cleiothyridina elegans Girty, 1910
 †Cleiothyridina epigona (Abich 1878)
 †Cleiothyridina excavata (Grabau 1931)
 †Cleiothyridina globulina (Waagen 1883)
 †Cleiothyridina grossula (Waagen 1883)
 †Cleiothyridina hayasakai Tazawa 2010
 †Cleiothyridina interposita (Reed 1944)
 †Cleiothyridina intonsa Chronic 1949
 †Cleiothyridina laminosa Fang 1994
 †Cleiothyridina laqueata Waterhouse 1968
 †Cleiothyridina macleayana (Etheridge 1889)
 †Cleiothyridina maynci Dunbar 1955
 †Cleiothyridina mulsa Cooper and Grant 1976
 †Cleiothyridina nana Cooper and Grant 1976
 †Cleiothyridina nielseni Dunbar 1955
 †Cleiothyridina nikolaevi Grunt 1977
 †Cleiothyridina orbicularis (McChesney 1859)
 †Cleiothyridina ovalis Shi 1993
 †Cleiothyridina pectinifera (Sowerby 1841)
 †Cleiothyridina perthensis Archbold 1997
 †Cleiothyridina pijaensis Waterhouse 1983
 †Cleiothyridina pilularis Cooper and Grant 1976
 †Cleiothyridina rara Cooper and Grant 1976
 †Cleiothyridina rectimarginata Cooper and Grant 1976
 †Cleiothyridina royssii (syn. Athyris royssii)
 †Cleiothyridina saraiensis (Reed 1944)
 †Cleiothyridina semiconcava (Waagen 1883)
 †Cleiothyridina seriata Grant 1976
 †Cleiothyridina shenshuensis (Lee and Su 1980)
 †Cleiothyridina simulans (Reed 1931)
 †Cleiothyridina solovjevae Grunt 1977
 †Cleiothyridina subexpansa (Waagen, 1883)
 †Cleiothyridina sublamellosa
 †Cleiothyridina tribulosa Grant 1976
 †Cleiothyridina tschironensis Kotlyar 1968
 †Cleiothyridina uralica (Grabau 1934)
 †Cleiothyridina warchensis Reed 1944
 †Cleiothyridina xetriformis (Reed 1944)
 †Cleiothyridina zhexiensis Liang 1982

See also 
 List of brachiopod genera

References 

 Cleiothyridina Buckman, 1906 (Brachiopoda): proposed validation under the plenary powers. CHC Brunton - Bull. zool. Nomencl, 1972

External links 

 
 

Prehistoric brachiopod genera
Rhynchonellata
Paleozoic life of Alberta
Paleozoic life of British Columbia
Paleozoic life of the Northwest Territories
Paleozoic life of Nunavut
Paleozoic life of Yukon